Ballyrashane is a small village and civil parish outside Coleraine, County Londonderry, Northern Ireland. The civil parish of Ballyrashane covers areas of County Antrim (in the historic barony of Dunluce Lower), as well as County Londonderry (in the historic barony of North East Liberties of Coleraine). It is part of Causeway Coast and Glens district.

It is well known for its creamery, Ballyrashane Creamery, which processes milk, butter and cheese for shops and supermarkets all over Ireland and Europe.

Ballyrashane Flute Band recently celebrated their 100th year (2008). They are a traditional "First Flute" marching band, and are known locally as "The White Army" due to their distinctive uniform.

There are two churches in Ballyrashane - the Presbyterian, and St John's Church of Ireland

Civil parish of Ballyrashane

Townlands 
The civil parish contains the following townlands:

A
Articrunaght North, Articrunaght South

B
Ballindreen Irish, Ballindreen Scotch, Ballynag Lower, Ballynag Upper, Ballyrock Irish, Ballyrock Scotch, Ballyvelton Lower, Ballyvelton Upper, Ballyversall, Ballywatt East, Ballywatt Leggs, Ballywatt West

C
Carnglass Beg, Carnglass More, Cloyfin South

G
Glebe, Gorticloghan

I
Island Effrick North, Island Effrick South

K
Kilmoyle, Kirkistown, Knocknakeeragh

L
Lisnagalt, Lisnarick, Lisnisk, Liswatty Lower, Liswatty Upper

O
Oldtown, Outhill

R
Revallagh North, Revallagh South, Risk

See also
List of towns and villages in Northern Ireland
List of civil parishes of County Antrim
List of civil parishes of County Londonderry

References

Villages in County Londonderry
 
Causeway Coast and Glens district